Clover Hill or Clover Hill Historic District may refer to:

Places in the UK
Clover Hill (ward), an electoral ward of the Pendle Borough Council, Lancashire, England
 Clover Hill, Kettering, an electoral ward of the Northamptonshire County Council, England

Places in the U.S.
 Clover Hill (Louisville, Kentucky), listed on the National Register of Historic Places (NRHP) in Kentucky
 Clover Hill, Maryland, a census-designated place
 Clover Hill (Brookeville, Maryland), listed on the NRHP
 Cloverhill, New Jersey
 Clover Hill (Patterson, North Carolina), listed on the NRHP
Clover Hill Mill, Maryville, Tennessee, listed on the NRHP
Clover Hill, Appomattox County, Virginia, a historic town later renamed Appomattox Court House
Clover Hill, Chesterfield County, Virginia
Clover Hill Railroad
Clover Hill High School
Clover Hill (Culpeper, Virginia), a historic plantation house